This is a list of genera in the plant family Fabaceae, or Leguminosae, commonly known as the legume, pea, or bean family, are a large and economically important family of flowering plants of about 765 genera and nearly 20,000 known species.

A 

Abrus
Acmispon
Acosmium
Acrocarpus Wight & Arn.
Adenocarpus
Adenodolichos
Adenolobus (Harv. ex Benth. & Hook.f.) Torre & Hillc.
Adesmia
Aenictophyton
Aeschynomene
Afgekia
Afzelia Sm.
Aganope
Airyantha
Aldina
Alexa
Alhagi
Alistilus
Almaleea
Alysicarpus
Amburana
Amherstia Wall.
Amicia
Ammodendron
Ammopiptanthus
Ammothamnus
Amphicarpaea
Amphiodon
Amorpha
Amphimas
Amphithalea
Anagyris
Anarthrophyllum
Ancistrotropis
Andira
Androcalymma Dwyer
Angylocalyx
Annea Mackinder & Wieringa
Antheroporum
Anthonotha P. Beauv.
Anthyllis
Antopetitia
Aotus
Aphanocalyx Oliver
Aphyllodium
Apios
Apoplanesia
Apuleia Mart.
Apurimacia
Arachis
Arapatiella Rizzini & A.Mattos
Arcoa Urb.
Argyrocytisus
Argyrolobium
Arquita E. Gagnon, G. P. Lewis & C. E. Hughes
Arthroclianthus
Aspalathus
Astragalus
Ateleia
Augouardia Pellegr.
Austrodolichos
Austrosteenisia

B 

Baikiaea Benth.
Balsamocarpon Clos 
Baphia
Baphiastrum
Baphiopsis
Baptisia
Barbieria
Barklya F. Muell.
Barnebydendron J.H.Kirkbr.
Batesia Spruce
Baudouinia Baill.
Bauhinia L.
Behaimia
Berlinia Sol. ex Hook. f.
Biancaea (Tod. ) E. Gagnon & G. P. Lewis
Bikinia Wieringa
Bionia
Bituminaria
Bobgunnia
Bocoa
Bolusafra
Bolusanthus
Bolusia
Bossiaea
Bowdichia
Bowringia
Brachycylix (Harms) R.S. Cowan
Brachystegia Benth.
Brandzeia Baill.
Brenierea Humbert
Brodriguesia R.S. Cowan
Brongniartia
Brownea Jacq.
Browneopsis Huber
Brya
Bryaspis
Burkea Benth.
Burkilliodendron
Bussea Harms
Butea

C 

Cadia
Caesalpinia (L.) E. Gagnon & G. P. Lewis
Cajanus
Calia
Calicotome
Callerya
Callistachys
Calobota
Calophaca
Calopogonium
Calpurnia
Camoensia
Campsiandra Benth.
Camptosema
Campylotropis
Canavalia
Candolleodendron
Caragana
Carmichaelia
Carrissoa
Cascaronia
Cassia L.
Castanospermum
Centrolobium
Cenostigma (Tul.) E. Gagnon & G. P. Lewis
Centrosema
Ceratonia L.
Cercis L.
Chadsia
Chaetocalyx
Chamaecrista Moench
Chamaecytisus
Chapmannia
Cheniella R.Clark & Mackinder
Chesneya
Chorizema
Christia
Cicer
Cladrastis
Clathrotropis
Cleobulia
Clianthus
Clitoria
Clitoriopsis
Cochlianthus
Cochliasanthus
Codariocalyx
Collaea
Cologania
Colophospermum J. Kirk ex J. Léonard
Colutea
Colvillea Bojer ex Hook.
Condylostylis
Conzattia Rose
Copaifera L.
Cordeauxia Hemsl.
Cordyla
Coronilla
Coulteria (Kunth) E. Gagnon, Sotuyo & G. P. Lewis
Coursetia
Craibia
Cranocarpus
Craspedolobium
Cratylia
Cristonia
Crotalaria
Cruddasia
Crudia Schreb.
Cryptosepalum Benth.
Cullen
Cyamopsis
Cyathostegia
Cyclocarpa
Cyclolobium
Cyclopia
Cymbosema
Cynometra L.
Cytisophyllum
Cytisopsis
Cytisus

D 

Dahlstedtia
Dalbergia
Dalbergiella
Dalea
Dalhousiea
Daniellia Benn.
Daviesia
Decorsea
Dendrolobium
Denisophytum (R. Vig.) E. Gagnon & G. P. Lewis
Derris
Dermatophyllum
Desmodiastrum
Desmodium
Detarium Juss.
Delonix Raf.
Dewevrea
Dialium L.
Dichilus
Dicorynia Benth.
Dicraeopetalum
Dicymbe Spruce ex Benth. & Hook. f.
Didelotia Baill.
Dillwynia
Dimorphandra Schott 
Dinizia Ducke
Dioclea
Diphyllarium
Diphysa
Diplotropis
Dipogon (plant)
Dipteryx
Diptychandra Tul.
Discolobium
Distemonanthus Benth.
Disynstemon
Dolichopsis
Dolichos
Dorycnium
Droogmansia
Dumasia
Dunbaria
Duparquetia 
Dussia
Dysolobium

E 

Ebenus
Echinospartum
Ecuadendron D.A. Neill
Eleiotis
Elizabetha Schomb. ex Benth.
Eligmocarpus Capuron
Eminia
Endertia Steenis & de Wit
Endosamara
Englerodendron Harms
Eperua Aubl.
Eremosparton
Erichsenia
Erinacea
Eriosema
Errazurizia
Erythrina
Erythrophleum Afzel. ex R.Br.
Erythrostemon (Klotzsch) E. Gagnon & G. P. Lewis
Etaballia
Euchilopsis
Euchlora
Euchresta
Eurypetalum Harms
Eutaxia
Eversmannia
Exostyles
Eysenhardtia
Ezoloba

F 

Fairchildia
Fiebrigiella
Fissicalyx
Flemingia
Fordia

G 

Gabonius Wieringa & Mackinder
Galactia
Galega
Gastrolobium
Geissaspis
Gelrebia E. Gagnon & G. P. Lewis
Genista
Genistidium
Geoffroea
Gigasiphon Drake
Gilbertiodendron J. Léonard
Gilletiodendron Vermoesen
Gleditsia L.
Gliricidia
Glycine
Glycyrrhiza
Gompholobium
Goniorrhachis Taub.
Gonocytisus
Goodia
Grazielodendron
Griffonia Baill.
Guianodendron
Guibourtia Benn.
Gueldenstaedtia
Guilandina L.
Gymnocladus Lam.

H 

Haematoxylum L.
Halimodendron
Hammatolobium
Haplormosia
Hardenbergia
Hardwickia Roxb.
Harleyodendron
Harpalyce
Hebestigma
Hedysarum
Helicotropis
Hererolandia E. Gagnon & G. P. Lewis
Herpyza
Hesperolaburnum
Heteroflorum M. Sousa
Heterostemon Desf.
Hippocrepis
Hoffmannseggia Cav.
Hoita
Holocalyx
Hosackia
Hovea
Hultholia E. Gagnon & G. P. Lewis
Humboldtia Vahl
Humularia
Hylodendron Taub.
Hymenaea L.
Hymenocarpos
Hymenolobium
Hymenostegia (Benth.) Harms
Hypocalyptus

I - J 

Icuria Wieringa
Indigastrum
Indigofera
Inocarpus
Intsia Thouars
Isoberlinia Craib & Stapf ex Holland
Isotropis
Isomacrolobium Aubrév. & Pellegr.
Jacksonia
Jacqueshuberia Ducke
Julbernardia Pellegr.

K 

Kalappia Kosterm.
Kennedia
Koompassia Maingay ex Benth.
Kotschya
Kummerowia

L 

Labichea Gaudich. ex DC.
Lablab
Laburnum
Lackeya
Ladeania A. N. Egan & Reveal
Lamprolobium
Lathyrus
Latrobea
Lebeckia
Lebruniodendron J. Léonard
Lecointea
Lembotropis
Lennea
Lens
Leobordea
Leonardoxa Aubrév.
Leptoderris
Leptodesmia
Leptolobium
Leptosema
Leptospron
Lespedeza
Lessertia
Leucomphalos
Leucostegane 
Lemuropisum H.Perrier
Libidibia (DC.) E. Gagnon & G. P. Lewis
Librevillea Hoyle
Limadendron
Liparia
Listia
Loesenera Harms
Lonchocarpus
Lophocarpinia Burkart
Lotononis
Lotus
Luetzelburgia
Lupinus
Luzonia
Lysidice Hance
Lysiphyllum (Benth.) deWit

M 

Maackia
Machaerium
Macrolobium Schreb.
Macropsychanthus
Macroptilium
Macrotyloma
Maniltoa Scheff.
Maraniona
Margaritolobium
Marina
Martiodendron Gleason
Mastersia
Mecopus
Medicago
Melanoxylum Schott
Melilotus
Melliniella
Melolobium
Mendoravia Capuron
Mezoneuron Desf.
Michelsonia Hauman
Micklethwaitia G.P. Lewis & Schrire
Microberlinia A. Chev.
Microcharis
Mildbraediodendron
Millettia
Mirbelia
Moldenhawera Schrad.
Monopteryx
Mora Benth.
Moullava (Adans.) E. Gagnon & G. P. Lewis
Mucuna
Muellera
Muelleranthus
Mundulea
Myrocarpus
Myrospermum
Myroxylon
Mysanthus

N 

Neoapaloxylon Rauschert
Neochevalierodendron J. Léonard
Neocollettia
Neoharmsia
Neonotonia
Neorautanenia
Neorudolphia
Nephrodesmus
Nesphostylis
Nissolia
Nogra
Normandiodendron J. Léonard

O 

Oberholzeria
 Oddoniodendron De Wild.
Olneya
Onobrychis
Ononis
Ophrestia
Orbexilum
Oreophysa
Ormocarpopsis
Ormocarpum
Ormosia
Orphanodendron
Ornithopus
Oryxis
Ostryocarpus
Otholobium
Otoptera
Ottleya
Oxylobium
Oxyrhynchus
Oxytropis

P - Q 

Pachyelasma Harms
Pachyrhizus
Paloue Aubl.
Paloveopsis R.S. Cowan
Panurea
Paracalyx
Paragoodia
Paramachaerium
Paramacrolobium J.Léonard
Parkinsonia L.
Parochetus
Parryella
Paubrasilia  E. Gagnon, H. C. Lima & G. P. Lewis
Pearsonia
Pediomelum
Peltogyne Vogel
Peltophorum (Vogel) Benth.
Periandra
Pericopsis
Petaladenium
Petalostylis R.Br.
Peteria
Petteria
Phanera Lour.
Phaseolus
Phylacium
Phyllodium
Phyllota
Phylloxylon
Physostigma
Pickeringia
Pictetia
Piliostigma Hochst.
Piptanthus
Piscidia
Pisum
Plagiocarpus
Plagiosiphon Harms
Platycelyphium
Platycyamus
Platylobium
Platymiscium
Platypodium
Platysepalum
Podalyria
Podocytisus
Podolobium
Poecilanthe
Poeppigia C.Presl
Poiretia
Poitea
Polhillia
Polystemonanthus Harms
Pomaria Cav.
Pongamiopsis
Prioria Griseb.
Pseudarthria
Pseudeminia
Pseudoeriosema
Pseudomacrolobium Hauman
Pseudovigna
Psophocarpus
Psoralea
Psoralidium
Psorothamnus
Pterocarpus
Pterodon
Pterogyne Tul.
Pterolobium R. Br. ex Wight & Arn.
Ptycholobium
Ptychosema
Pueraria
Pultenaea
Pycnospora
Pyranthus

R 

Rafnia
Ramirezella
Ramorinoa
Recordoxylon Ducke
Retama
Rhodopis
Rhynchosia
Rhynchotropis
Riedeliella
Robinia
Robynsiophyton
Rothia
Rupertia

S 

Sakoanala
Salweenia
Saraca L.
Sarcodum
Sartoria
Schefflerodendron
Scorpiurus
Sellocharis
Senna Mill.
Sesbania
Schnella Raddi
Schizolobium Vogel
Schotia Jacq.
Sclerolobium Vogel
Scorodophloeus Harms
Shuteria
Sigmoidotropis
Sinodolichos
Sindora Miq.
Sindoropsis J. Léonard
Smirnowia
Smithia
Soemmeringia
Sophora
Spartium
Spartocytisus
Spathionema
Spatholobus
Sphaerolobium
Sphaerophysa
Sphenostylis
Sphinctospermum
Spirotropis
Spongiocarpella
Stachyothyrsus Harms
Stauracanthus
Staminodianthus
Steinbachiella
Stemonocoleus Harms
Stenodrepanum Harms
Stirtonanthus
Stonesiella
Streblorrhiza
Strongylodon
Strophostyles
Stylosanthes
Styphnolobium
Storckiella Seem
Stuhlmannia Taub.
Swainsona
Swartzia
Sweetia
Sylvichadsia
Sympetalandra Stapf
Syrmatium

T 

Tabaroa
Tachigali Aubl.
Tadehagi
Talbotiella Baker f.
Tamarindus L.
Tara (Molina) E. Gagnon & G. P. Lewis
Taralea
Taverniera
Templetonia
Tephrosia
Teramnus
Tetraberlinia (Harms) Hauman
Tetrapterocarpon Humbert
Tessmannia Harms
Teyleria
Thermopsis
Thinicola
Tipuana
Trifidacanthus
Trifolium
Trigonella
Tripodion
Trischidium
Tylosema (Schweinf.) Torre & Hillc.

U - Z 

Uittienia Steenis
Uleanthus
Ulex
Umtiza Sim
Uraria
Uribea
Urodon
Vandasina
Vatairea
Vataireopsis
Vatovaea
Vavilovia
Vermifrux
Vicia
Vigna
Viminaria
Virgilia
Vouacapoua Aubl.
Wajira
Weberbauerella
Wiborgia
Wiborgiella
Wisteria
Xanthocercis
Xiphotheca
Zenia Chun
Zenkerella Taub.
Zollernia
Zornia
Zuccagnia Cav
Zygocarpum

References

 
Fabaceae